The 1997 Daily Mirror/Sporting Life Greyhound Derby took place during May & June with the final being held on 28 June 1997 at Wimbledon Stadium. The winner Some Picture received £50,000. The competition was sponsored by the Sporting Life and Daily Mirror.

Final result 
At Wimbledon (over 480 metres):

Distances 
6¼, ½, 3¾, head, 3 (lengths)
The distances between the greyhounds are in finishing order and shown in lengths. One length is equal to 0.08 of one second.

Race Report
 Some Picture the recent Scottish Greyhound Derby champion remained unbeaten going into the final. Three greyhounds broke well out of the traps, they were Stows Val, Annies Bullet and Some Picture but as they came to the first bend Annies Bullet was squeezed out and lost all chance of winning. Some Picture and Stows Val led around the first two bends well clear of the pack but the Charlie Lister trained black dog forged ahead down the back straight leading to an comfortable victory. He Knows made up good ground to finish runner up. The winning time was a very fast 28.23 sec, the fastest time ever for a Wimbledon Derby final, and just two spots outside Greenane Squire's rack record.

Quarter finals

Semi finals

See also
1997 UK & Ireland Greyhound Racing Year

References

Greyhound Derby
English Greyhound Derby